John Charles Bowring (24 March 1821 – 20 June 1893) was a Hong Kong businessman, a partner in the firm Jardine, Matheson & Co., and a keen amateur naturalist and JP for the County of Devon.

He was the eldest son of Sir John Bowring (1792–1872), of Exeter, Devon, Governor of Hong Kong, and accompanied him on some of his travels. He was brother of Lewin Bentham Bowring and Edgar Alfred Bowring.

Bowring was a passionate botanist and entomologist (more specifically a coleopterist; a student in the study of beetles). Throughout his travels with his father, Sir John Bowring, he studied, took notes, and collected certain rare plants and beetles whenever the opportunity presented itself. In 1852 Bowring brought from Hong Kong ferns, mosses, and flowering plants back to England.

Upon his widow's death in 1912 she bequeathed funds for the building of a cottage hospital in Haygate Road, Shropshire, in his memory. His sons included:
Sir Charles Calvert Bowring, Governor of Nyasaland 
Rear Admiral Humphrey Wykeham Bowring
He left a large collection of coleoptera to the British Museum.

Two species of lizards, Hemidactylus bowringii and Subdoluseps bowringii, are named in honor of John Charles Bowring or his father Sir John Bowring.

References

External links
 J.C. Bowring's gift of Egyptian artifacts to the Royal Albert Memorial Museum, Exeter

1821 births
1893 deaths
John Charles
People from the London Borough of Hackney
English naturalists
English justices of the peace
19th-century English businesspeople